Radio Vrhbosna or Radio postaja Vrhbosna  was a Bosnian commercial radio station, broadcasting on Croatian language from Sarajevo, Bosnia and Herzegovina. Radio postaja Vrhbosna was founded on 11 April 1993 (During Bosnian war and Siege of Sarajevo).
The program was broadcast at one frequency (Sarajevo ) and the station focused on contemporary music, talk shows and local news.

Since 18 May 2016 RSG Group bought the frequency (90.5 MHz) for its new radio station Radio Mix.

See also 
Radio Mix
Media in Sarajevo
List of radio stations in Bosnia and Herzegovina

References

External links 
 
 Katolička tiskovna agncija Biskupske konferencije Bosne i Hercegovine
 Communications Regulatory Agency of Bosnia and Herzegovina

Sarajevo
Radio stations established in 1993
Radio stations disestablished in 2016
Mass media in Sarajevo
Vrhbosna
Defunct mass media in Bosnia and Herzegovina